Luis Guzmán (born 1956) is a Puerto Rican actor.

Luis Guzmán may also refer to:

Luis Guzmán (water polo) (born 1945), Mexican Olympic water polo player
Luis Enríquez de Guzmán, 9th Count of Alba de Liste (born c. 1605), viceroy of New Spain and Peru
Luis Muñoz de Guzmán (1735–1808), Spanish colonial administrator
Luis Roberto Guzmán (born 1966), Puerto Rican actor

See also
 Luisa de Guzmán (1613–1666), Spanish noblewoman